Duranus is a commune in the Alpes-Maritimes department in southeastern France.

Population

Tourism
Duranus is one of sixteen villages grouped together by the Métropole Nice Côte d'Azur tourist department as the Route des Villages Perchés (Route of Perched Villages). The others are as follows: Aspremont, Carros, Castagniers, Coaraze, Colomars, Èze, Falicon, La Gaude, Lantosque, Levens, La Roquette-sur-Var, Saint-Blaise, Saint-Jeannet, Tourrette-Levens and Utelle.

See also
Communes of the Alpes-Maritimes department

References

External links
La mine de Duranus, à Athena

Duranus
Alpes-Maritimes communes articles needing translation from French Wikipedia